The 1974 NCAA Division I men's ice hockey tournament was the culmination of the 1973–74 NCAA Division I men's ice hockey season, the 27th such tournament in NCAA history. It was held between March 14 and 16, 1974, and concluded with Minnesota defeating Michigan Tech 4-2. All games were played at the Boston Garden in Boston, Massachusetts.

This is the last tournament to not have a team returning from the previous season's bracket. (as of 2016)

Qualifying teams
Four teams qualified for the tournament, two each from the eastern and western regions. The ECAC tournament champion and the two WCHA tournament co-champions received automatic bids into the tournament. An at-large bid was offered to a second eastern team based upon both their ECAC tournament finish as well as their regular season record.

Format
The ECAC champion was seeded as the top eastern team while the WCHA co-champion with the better regular season record was given the top western seed. The second eastern seed was slotted to play the top western seed and vice versa. All games were played at the Boston Garden. All matches were Single-game eliminations with the semifinal winners advancing to the national championship game and the losers playing in a consolation game.

Tournament bracket

Note: * denotes overtime period(s)

Semifinals

(E1) Boston University vs. (W2) Minnesota

(W1) Michigan Tech vs. (E2) Harvard

Consolation Game

(E1) Boston University vs. (E2) Harvard

National Championship

(W1) Michigan Tech vs. (W2) Minnesota

All-Tournament team
G: Brad Shelstad* (Minnesota)
D: Les Auge (Minnesota)
D: Jim Nahrgang (Michigan Tech)
F: Steve Jensen (Michigan Tech)
F: Jim McMahon (Harvard)
F: Mike Polich (Minnesota)
* Most Outstanding Player(s)

References

Tournament
NCAA Division I men's ice hockey tournament
NCAA Division I Men's Ice Hockey Tournament
NCAA Division I Men's Ice Hockey Tournament
NCAA Division I Men's Ice Hockey Tournament
Ice hockey competitions in Boston